Rager is a surname. Notable people with the surname include:

Chris Rager, American voice actor
Jordan Rager (born 1994), American country music singer
Mose Rager (1911–1986), American guitarist
Roger Rager (1948–2022), American racing driver
Yitzhak Rager (1932–1997), Israeli journalist, diplomat and a Likud mayor of Beersheba

See also
A♯1 Roller Rager, is a song by American heavy metal band CKY
Early 20 Rager, is a song from the debut studio album by American rapper Lil Uzi Vert
Man on the Moon II: The Legend of Mr. Rager, is the second studio album by American rapper Kid Cudi
The Rager, is the third episode of The Vampire Diaries's fourth season

References